Bonnyton may refer to places in Scotland:
 Bonnyton, Aberdeenshire
Bonnyton, Angus, a small settlement in the parish of Auchterhouse
Bonnyton, East Ayrshire
 Bonnyton, a part of the Barony of Bonshaw containing or adjacent to Girgenti House, East Ayrshire
 Bonnyton Moor by Eaglesham, East Renfrewshire, where the aircraft carrying Rudolf Hess crashed during World War II

See also 

 Bonnyton Thistle F.C.